John Oliver Davy (born 1 July 1974) is an Irish cricketer. A right-handed batsman and left-arm fast-medium bowler, he made his debut for the Ireland cricket team in a match against Scotland in July 1997 and went on to play for them 26 times, his last match coming against Zimbabwe A in April 2000. Of his matches for Ireland, two were first-class matches against Scotland and four had List A status. In all matches for Ireland, he scored 131 runs at an average of 8.73, his top score being 51 not out against Scotland in August 1997, and took 33 wickets at an average of 34.85, his best bowling being 4/16 against Wales in July 1997.

He represented Ireland in the 1998 European Championship and at the 2000 ICC Emerging Nations Tournament. His twin brother Peter also represented Ireland at cricket.

References

1974 births
Living people
Irish cricketers
Cricketers from County Dublin
Twin sportspeople
Irish twins